Ðulijano Koludra (born 24 January 1974) is a Croatian bobsledder. He competed in the four man event at the 2002 Winter Olympics.

References

1974 births
Living people
Croatian male bobsledders
Olympic bobsledders of Croatia
Bobsledders at the 2002 Winter Olympics
Sportspeople from Split, Croatia